The Ramones were an American punk rock band from New York City. Their discography consists of fourteen studio albums, ten live albums, sixteen compilation albums, seventy-one singles, thirty-two music videos and ten films. The band formed in early 1974, and upon signing with Seymour Stein of Sire Records, the Ramones released their self-titled debut album on April 23, 1976. Despite the recording process only taking a week and being on a budget of $6,400, the album has since become their most accoladed and iconic release. 1977's Leave Home was the band's follow up album, released less than a year later, also through Sire. While it was the first album to chart in the United Kingdom, it did not chart as well in the United States as Ramones, nor their third record, Rocket to Russia, which was released in late 1977. Road to Ruin was the band's fourth studio album and their first to feature a change in the band member line-up, with drummer Marky Ramone replacing Tommy Ramone.

It's Alive, released in 1979, was the Ramones' first live album, and only one to chart. The band's following studio album, 1980's End of the Century, was their only record produced by Phil Spector and their most successful album commercially, peaking at #44 on the United States Billboard 200 and charting in six other countries. In 1981 they released Pleasant Dreams with producer Graham Gouldman who, according to the album's critics, sparked a change in the Ramones' style of music, beginning a transition away from classic punk rock, surf punk and British punk sounds toward heavier punk rock, heavy metal and acid rock elements. Subterranean Jungle, released in 1983, would be the band's final release to chart within the top 100 of the Billboard 200, and was also the final release before firing Marky as drummer. Richie Ramone would be the band's new drummer for 1984's Too Tough to Die, which was produced by former drummer Tommy alongside Ed Stasium. While the album was critically acclaimed for having similar characteristics to the band's earlier albums, their next release, 1986's Animal Boy, incorporated more contemporary production techniques and sounds, including synthesizers.

Richie's final appearance would be on 1987's Halfway to Sanity, with Elvis Ramone briefly replacing him for two performances in August before Marky was brought back into the band. The band's first compilation album, entitled Ramones Mania, was released in 1988 and would go on to be certified Gold in the United States. 1989's Brain Drain would be their final album to feature Dee Dee Ramone as bassist, as well as their last to be released through Sire. The Ramones signed to Radioactive Records and released Mondo Bizarro in 1992 with new bassist C.J. Ramone. Despite being the band's least successful studio album in respect to the Billboard 200, it went Gold in Brazil in 2001. Their first, and only, cover album, Acid Eaters, was released in 1993, just a year and a half before the band's fourteenth and final studio album, ¡Adios Amigos!, produced by Halfway to Sanity producer Daniel Rey. Although the Ramones disbanded in mid-1996, thirteen compilation albums and four live albums have been released since then.

Albums

Studio albums

Live albums

Compilation albums

Singles

 A "We Want the Airwaves" and "The KKK Took My Baby Away" charted together at No. 50 on the Billboard Hot Dance Club Play chart.
 B "Howling at the Moon (Sha-La-La)" and "Chasing the Night" were released together as a double A-side single in the UK.
 C "Something to Believe In" and "Somebody Put Something in My Drink" were released together as a double A-side single in the UK.

Music videos

Films

Tribute albums

Full album tributes

Other tributes

References
Citations

Bibliography

External links

Discography
Discographies of American artists
Ramones, The